Karnail Ganj  is a village in Bhulath Tehsil in Kapurthala district of Punjab State, India. The village is administrated by a Sarpanch, who is an elected representative.

Demography 
According to the report published by Census India in 2011, Karnail Ganj has 171 houses with the total population of 795 persons of which 410 are male and 385 females. Literacy rate of Karnail Ganj is 77.98%, higher than the state average of 75.84%.  The population of children in the age group 0–6 years is 91 which is 11.45% of the total population.  Child sex ratio is approximately 685, lower than the state average of 846.

Population data 

As per census 2011, 259 people were engaged in work activities out of the total population of Karnail Ganj which includes 243 males and 16 females. According to census survey report 2011, 96.14% workers (Employment or Earning more than 6 Months) describe their work as main work and 3.86% workers are involved in Marginal activity providing livelihood for less than 6 months.

Caste 
The village doesn't have any schedule caste (SC) and Schedule Tribe (ST) population. Saini, jatt, lubana, kamboj are natives of karnail ganj.

Transport 
There are no railway stations near to Karnail Ganj in less than 10 km however, Jalandhar City Railway station is 35 km away from the village. The village is 77 km away from Sri Guru Ram Dass Jee International Airport in Amritsar and the another nearest airport is Pathankot Airport in Pathankot which is located 76 km away from the village. Kartarpur, Urmar Tanda, Dasua, Qadian are the nearby Cities to Karnail Ganj village.

Nearby villages 
 Akala, 
 Bagrian
 Bajaj
 Bhatnura Kalan
 Bhatnura Khurd
 Boparai
 Fatehpur
 Jhall Bajaj
 Lamman
 Nadali
 Tandi

References

List of cities near the village 
Bhulath
Kapurthala 
Phagwara 
Sultanpur Lodhi

Air travel connectivity 
The closest International airport to the village is Sri Guru Ram Dass Jee International Airport.

External links
 Villages in Kapurthala
 List of Villages in Kapurthala Tehsil

Villages in Kapurthala district